Toddrick Poole McIntosh (January 22, 1972 – September 5, 2014) was a National Football League (NFL) defensive end for the Dallas Cowboys, Tampa Bay Buccaneers and New Orleans Saints. He played college football at Florida State.

Early years
McIntosh attended Lloyd V. Berkner High School, where as a senior he made 77 tackles and 4 sacks, while receiving All-state honors. He accepted a football scholarship from Florida State University.

As a redshirt freshman defensive tackle, he had 33 tackles (3 for loss). In 1991, he was a reserve defensive end that was used in pass rushing situations, registering 6.5 sacks, five tackles for loss, two forced fumbles, and one fumble recovery. He is probably best known for a notable interception he returned 49 yards for a touchdown in the #1–vs.–#3 matchup against the University of Michigan.

As a junior, he became a starter at nose guard, tallying 44 tackles and 2 sacks. In his last year he was the starter at left defensive end, posting 48 tackles (5.5 for loss) and 2 sacks, while helping his team clinch the school's first national championship. He had a season high 9 tackles against the University of Miami.

Professional career

Dallas Cowboys
McIntosh was selected in the seventh round (216th overall) of the 1994 NFL Draft by the Dallas Cowboys. He was waived on November 21.

Tampa Bay Buccaneers
He was claimed off waivers by the Tampa Bay Buccaneers. He was released on December 19, 1995.

New Orleans Saints
McIntosh was claimed off waivers by the New Orleans Saints.

Green Bay Packers
On May 11, 1996, he was traded to the Green Bay Packers in exchange for future considerations. He was cut before the season started.

Minnesota Vikings
On August 18, 1997, he was released by the Minnesota Vikings.

Toronto Argonauts (CFL)
On May 21, 1998, he signed with the Toronto Argonauts of the Canadian Football League.

Tampa Bay Storm (AFL)
McIntosh spent part of 1999 season playing for the Tampa Bay Storm of the Arena Football League.

Personal life
On September 5, 2014, he was declared clinically dead, after being in a coma from a stroke.

References 

1972 births
2014 deaths
American football defensive ends
Florida State Seminoles football players
Dallas Cowboys players
Tampa Bay Buccaneers players
Tampa Bay Storm players
Toronto Argonauts players
New Orleans Saints players
Players of American football from Tallahassee, Florida